Nidia is a female given name that may refer to professional wrestler Nidia Guenard or another notable person listed below:

Nidia Bustos Nicaraguan director
Nidia Morrell (born 1953), Argentine astronomer
Nidia Muñoz (born 1991), Cuban taekwondoist
Nidia María Jiménez Vásquez Costa Rican politician
Nidia Vílchez (born 1964), Peruvian politician

See also

Feminine given names